The 1908 Paris–Roubaix was the 13th edition of the Paris–Roubaix, a classic one-day cycle race in France. The single day event was held on 19 April 1908 and stretched  from Paris to its end in a velodrome in Roubaix. The winner was Cyrille Van Hauwaert from Belgium.

Results

References

Paris–Roubaix
Paris-Roubaix
Paris-Roubaix
Paris-Roubaix